Kadashan Bay is located on Chichagof Island on the south side of Tenakee Inlet. It is named after Paul K. Kadashan, a Tlingit native who applied for a homestead in the area in 1915. The escort carrier USS Kadashan Bay was named after it.

References

Alexander Archipelago
Bays of Alaska
Bays of Hoonah–Angoon Census Area, Alaska
Bodies of water of Sitka, Alaska